Transworld Surf (titled Transworld Surf: Next Wave on GameCube) is a sports video game developed by Angel Studios and published by Infogrames The game was released for GameCube, PlayStation 2, and Xbox between November 2001 and March 2003. The Xbox version of the game was the third game released under Infogrames' newly-revamped Atari label.

Reception

The PlayStation 2 and Xbox versions received "favorable" reviews, while the GameCube version received "average" reviews, according to video game review aggregator Metacritic. However, NextGen said of the Xbox version, "The water effects are cool, as is the soundtrack, but with an unforgivably steep learning curve and that intrinsic repetitiveness, only the most extreme fanatics of the stunt genre will get much joy out of this."

The same Xbox version was nominated for GameSpots annual "Best In-Game Water" award at the Best and Worst of 2001 Awards, which went to Wave Race: Blue Storm.

References

External links
 
 

Atari games
Infogrames games
2001 video games
GameCube games
PlayStation 2 games
Surfing video games
Video games developed in the United States
Xbox games
Multiplayer and single-player video games